The National Assembly is the unicameral parliament of Laos. The National Assembly meets in Vientiane.

Laos is a one-party state, with the Lao People's Revolutionary Party as the sole legal party in the country. Most of the National Assembly's actions simply rubber stamp the party's decisions. Efforts have been made to increase the capacity of its members, aiming to strengthen their legislative, oversight, and representational capacities.

History 
The National Assembly was established in its current form by the Lao Constitution of 1991, replacing the Supreme People's Assembly (the latter also formerly known as the Supreme People's Council). After the December 1997 elections, the number of seats were increased to 99, a new structure was announced and Samane Vignaket was elected as its president.

The last elections were held on 21 February 2021. The Lao People's Revolutionary Party (LPRP) took 158 seats in the enlarged 164-member National Assembly while the six remaining seats went to independents.

In 2017, construction started on a new National Assembly building, gifted by Vietnam. The construction was completed in 2021.

Committees
Parliamentary committees of the National Assembly currently include:
Law Committee
Economic, Technology and Environment Committee
Planning, Finance and Audit Committee
Cultural and Social Committee
Ethnic Affairs Committee
National Defence and Security Committee
Foreign Affairs Committee

Latest election

See also
List of presidents of the National Assembly of Laos
Parliament of the Kingdom of Laos
Politics of Laos

References

External links